Didier Cuche (born 16 August 1974) is a former World Cup alpine ski racer from Switzerland.

Career
Born in Le Pâquier, Neuchâtel, he competed in the downhill and super-G, along with the giant slalom. He won the World Cup downhill and super-G title for the 2011 season and has won three previous downhill titles in 2010, 2008 and 2007, along with a giant slalom title in 2009. Cuche has 21 World Cup race victories, along with 67 podiums (top three) and 181 top ten finishes. He is also an Olympic silver medalist and has won a total of four World Championships medals (a gold, two silvers, and a bronze). He retired from competition following the 2012 season.

At the 1998 Winter Olympics in Nagano, Japan, Cuche was the silver medalist in the super-G, where he had exactly the same time as Hans Knauss resulting in a rare sharing of the medal (no bronze medal was awarded).

Cuche switched from Atomic to Head skis following the 2006 season, joining Bode Miller and Hermann Maier.

During the 2007 season, Cuche was in top form, winning the downhill season title with a victory and four-second-place finishes. In the Bormio downhill on 28 December 2006 he finished second, 0.01 seconds behind winner Michael Walchhofer, the smallest measurable amount in ski racing.

Cuche repeated as the World Cup downhill season champion in 2008 with 584 points, five ahead of overall champion Bode Miller. Cuche finished third overall and nearly won the super-G season title, finishing a single point behind champion Hannes Reichelt.

At the 2009 World Championships in Val-d'Isère, France, Cuche won the super-G and was the silver medalist in the downhill.

A week after winning the super-G and downhill at Kitzbühel in 2010, Cuche broke his right thumb in the giant slalom at Kranjska Gora, Slovenia, on 29 January, two weeks before the 2010 Winter Olympics. The injury put Cuche's Olympic participation in doubt, and he was immediately flown to Switzerland. After successful thumb surgery, he was cleared to compete in the Olympics in Canada. 
Cuche had a disappointing Olympics and did not win any medal; however, he regained the title of World Cup downhill champion for the 2010 season at the first post-Olympic race. Cuche won the downhill on the challenging Olympiabakken course at Kvitfjell, Norway, on 6 March for his fifth World Cup victory of the season. Until 2010, Cuche had never won more than two World Cup events in a single season.

It was also his fourth downhill victory in Kitzbühel, which tied him with Franz Klammer for the record on the Hahnenkamm. He has since added a fifth victory in Kitzbühel to his tally, thus becoming the sole record holder; Klammer was there to congratulate him at the finish.

At the 2011 World Championships in February, he won the silver medal in the downhill. In March he won the World Cup downhill championship for the 2011 season. This marked the fourth time he won the season title (2011, 2010, 2008, 2007), a record only surpassed by Franz Klammer who won the title five times. He ended the 2011 World Cup season in first-place ranking in downhill and super-G, finishing second in the overall rankings to Ivica Kostelić.

On 19 January 2012 Cuche announced his retirement for the end of the 2012 season. He gave his retirement speech in Kitzbühel during which he stated that he wanted to "leave the World Cup stage on a high". Only two days later, Cuche won the Hahnenkamm race in Kitzbühel for the fifth time in his career, including his first World Cup win in 1998. The following week, Cuche won the downhill at Garmisch, Germany, for his twentieth World Cup victory.

In December 2012, the Swiss ski federation announced that Cuche would work with his former teammates as a downhill coach after they suffered a slow start to the season.

Other awards
Cuche won the Swiss Sports Personality of the Year in 2009 and 2011. In January 2012 during the "Swiss Awards" he won the Swiss Person of the Year award in 2011.

World Cup results

Season standings

Season titles
6 season titles: 4 downhill, 1 super-G, 1 giant slalom

Race victories
21 wins (12 downhill, 6 super-G, 3 giant slalom)
67 podiums (32 DH, 23 SG, 12 GS)

World Championship results

Olympic results

References

External links
 
 

  
 Swiss Ski team official site 
 Didier Cuche at Head Skis

1974 births
Living people
People from Val-de-Ruz District
Swiss male alpine skiers
Alpine skiers at the 1998 Winter Olympics
Alpine skiers at the 2002 Winter Olympics
Alpine skiers at the 2006 Winter Olympics
Alpine skiers at the 2010 Winter Olympics
Olympic alpine skiers of Switzerland
Medalists at the 1998 Winter Olympics
Olympic medalists in alpine skiing
Olympic silver medalists for Switzerland
FIS Alpine Ski World Cup champions
Blancpain Endurance Series drivers
Sportspeople from the canton of Neuchâtel